Balasaheb Hanumantrao Khardekar (Also known as Balasaheb  Hanmantrao Khardekar) (1 August 1903 – 26 December 1963) was an educationist and politician who represented Kolhapur as a Member of Parliament in the 1st Lok Sabha. He was also member of constituent assembly representing Bombay States.

Background
Khardekar was born in Bombay Presidency, British India on 1 August 1903. He was educated from the University of Bombay and Cambridge University with a degree in law. He was a teacher by vocation and served as principal of Rajaram College, Kolhapur from 1940 to 1944.

Public life
Khardekar was member of Constituent assembly representing Bombay States. He was opposed to prohibition as a constitutional measure. He was elected a Member of Parliament for the  First Lok Sabha in 1952. He represented the Kolhapur constituency as an independent.

References

India MPs 1952–1957
People from Kolhapur
Lok Sabha members from Maharashtra
1903 births
1963 deaths
University of Mumbai alumni
People from Kolhapur district
Members of the Constituent Assembly of India